Bartolomeo Cerveri (1420 - 21 April 1466) was an Italian Roman Catholic priest of the Order of Preachers. Cerveri served as an inquisitor for Piedmont and Liguria and knew of the threats against his life being an inquisitor; a small group of heretics killed him in Cuneo. He was beatified in 1853.

Life
Bartolomeo Cerveri was born in 1420 in Cuneo and was noted in his childhood for his piousness and devotion to the faith.

After studies in Savigliano and Turin, he entered the Order of Preachers. In 1445, he ordained to priesthood. Cerveri obtained his licentiate as well as his master's and doctorate's degree - on 8 May 1452 - at the University of Turin in an occasion that was the first and last time when someone received all three at the same time. He taught there until 1453 until he was elected as prior of the Dominican convent in Savigliano.

Cerveri converted heretics and this led to his appointment as an inquisitor for Piedmont and Liguria in 1451 in which it was clear to him that he would soon be targeted and killed. Being a Dominican in that region at that time was dangerous and meant that heretics could take their hatred out on the new Dominican inquisitor.

He made his final confession before he set off for his final trip alongside two of his companions - the brothers Giovanni and Gianpietro Riccardi. He said of it: "I go there as an inquisitor and there I must die". On the road in Cervere he and his two companions were attacked though the five attackers wounded the companions but killed him after riddling him with dagger wounds. Those that washed his remains before his funeral found that despite the wounds he had not bled. His remains were relocated in 1802. Due to Cerveri's local veneration Pope Pius IX confirmed his beatification on 22 September 1853.

References

1420 births
1466 deaths
15th-century venerated Christians
15th-century Italian Roman Catholic priests
15th-century Roman Catholic martyrs
Beatifications by Pope Pius IX
Catholic martyrs
Dominican beatified people
Italian beatified people
Italian Dominicans
Members of the Dominican Order
People from Cuneo
University of Turin alumni
Academic staff of the University of Turin
Venerated Catholics
Venerated Dominicans